Lalisquri, is a village in the Telavi district of Georgia.

Demography

See also
 Telavi Municipality

References 

Populated places in Telavi Municipality